Three Brothers is a 2014 Czech film directed by Jan Svěrák and written by his father, Zdeněk Svěrák.

Plot
The film is about brothers Jan, Pepa and Matěj. They set up to find a bride. The film is divided into three parts. Each part follow one brother as he finds his love. Jan saves Sleeping Beauty and a cursed Kingdom. Jan then marries Sleeping Beauty and becomes new King. Matěj becomes Gamekeeper in Jan's forest. He saves Little Red Riding Hood and her Grandmother from evil Wolf. Matěj is then promised to marry Little Red Riding Hood when she becomes old enough. Pepa falls in love with Maruška who lives her Stepmother and her Stepsister Holena. Stepmother tries to get him to marry Holena but Pepa rejects her and eventually marries Maruška.

Cast
 Tomáš Klus as Jan
 Vojtěch Dyk as Pepa
 Zdeněk Piškula as Matěj
 Kateřina Kosová as Sleeping Beauty
 Sabina Rojková as Maruška
 Gabriela Míčová as Mother of the brothers
 Oldřich Kaiser as Father of the brothers
 Zuzana Norisová as Queen
 Kamil Halbich as Counsellor
 Zdeněk Svěrák as Teacher
 Jan Holík as Counsellor
 David Matásek as King
 Lucie Maria Štouračová as Little Red Riding Hood
 Petr Reidinger as Father of Little Red Riding Hood
 Jitka Čvančarová as Mother of Little Red Riding Hood
 Jitka Smutná as Grandmother of Little Red Riding Hood
 Ivana Chýlková as Stepmother
 Alena Doláková as Holena
 Jiří Lábus as Witch

References

External links
 

2014 films
2010s musical fantasy films
Czech musical fantasy films
2010s Czech-language films
Films directed by Jan Svěrák
Films with screenplays by Zdeněk Svěrák
Czech Lion Awards winners (films)
Films based on fairy tales